Hans Jacob Hansteen (born 11 April 1938) is a Norwegian architect.

Born in Stavanger, he graduated from the Norwegian Institute of Technology in 1961 and worked as a professor there from 1977 to 1995. From 1993 to 2003 he was chief inspector of historic buildings in Oslo. He is a board member of the Norwegian Institute for Cultural Heritage Research.

References

1938 births
Living people
Norwegian architects
Norwegian Institute of Technology alumni
Academic staff of the Norwegian Institute of Technology
People from Stavanger